The 2011 United Kingdom local elections were held on Thursday 5 May 2011. In England, direct elections were held in all 36 Metropolitan boroughs, 194 Second-tier district authorities, 49 unitary authorities and various mayoral posts, meaning local elections took place in all parts of England with the exception of seven unitary authorities (Cornwall, Durham, Northumberland, Isles of Scilly, Shropshire, the Isle of Wight and Wiltshire), and seven districts and boroughs (Adur, Cheltenham, Fareham, Gosport, Hastings, Nuneaton and Bedworth and Oxford). For the majority of English districts and the 25 unitary authorities that are elected "all out" these were the first elections since 2007. In Northern Ireland, there were elections to all 26 local councils. Elections also took place to most English parish councils.

On the same day, elections to the Scottish Parliament, National Assembly of Wales and Northern Ireland Assembly were held. A UK-wide referendum on whether to adopt the Alternative Vote electoral system for elections to the House of Commons and the Leicester South by-election was also held.

Labour, contesting its first elections under the leadership of Ed Miliband, finished narrowly ahead of the Conservatives. The BBC's projected national vote share put Labour on 37%, the Conservatives on 35% and the Liberal Democrats on 15%. Rallings and Thrasher of Plymouth University put Labour narrowly behind on 37% of the national vote, compared to 38% for the Conservatives and 16% for the Liberal Democrats.

Background
Elections were due to be held to Scottish councils, but these have been postponed until 2012 to avoid clashing with the elections to the Scottish Parliament, which in 2007 had caused confusion among voters.

British, Irish, Commonwealth and European Union citizens living in the UK  who were 18 or over on election day were entitled to vote in the local council and devolved legislatures elections. The deadline for voters in England, Wales and Northern Ireland to register to vote in the 5 May elections was midnight on Thursday 14 April 2011, whilst voters in Scotland had until midnight on Friday 15 April 2011 to register. Anyone in the United Kingdom who qualified as an anonymous elector had until midnight on Tuesday 26 April 2011 to register.

Results
The Labour Party was described as obtaining "mixed results". Their support recovered following a string of poor local election results during Gordon Brown's tenure and they gained over 800 council seats, mostly off the Liberal Democrats. Labour's gains were overshadowed by the coinciding Scottish Parliament election where they were routed by the Scottish National Party. The Conservatives narrowly obtained more votes than Labour and gained a small number of seats.  They were helped by the gaining additional seats from the Liberal Democrats in the south west, south, south east and East Anglia.

The election was a disaster for the Liberal Democrats, who lost 40% of the council seats they were defending (mostly to Labour) and lost majorities in 9 of the 19 councils they controlled, including strongholds in Sheffield and Hull. There were some surprising gains for the Conservatives against the Liberal Democrats, with councils previously considered strongholds for the latter, like North Norfolk, Vale of White Horse and Lewes changing hands.  This led to some calls for Nick Clegg to resign. The losses coincided with the landslide rejection of the Alternative Vote referendum which had been supported by the Liberal Democrats and some members of the Labour Party.

UK-wide results

Source: and Vote 2011: Northern Ireland Council Elections

Summary of English result

Source:

England

Metropolitan boroughs
All 36 English Metropolitan borough councils one third of their seats were up for election.

Unitary authorities

Whole council
In 30 English Unitary authorities the whole council were up for election.

Third of council
In 19 English Unitary authorities one third of the council were up for election.

Non-metropolitan districts

Whole council
In 127 English district authorities the whole council were up for election.

Third of council
In 67 English district authorities one third of the council were up for election.

Mayoral elections
Five direct mayoral elections were held.

Northern Ireland

Elections were held on the same day to local government in Northern Ireland.

References

 
2011
2011 elections in the United Kingdom
May 2011 events in the United Kingdom